The Love numbers (h, k, and l) are dimensionless parameters that measure the rigidity of a planetary body and the susceptibility of its shape to change in response to a tidal potential.

In 1909, Augustus Edward Hough Love introduced the values h and k which characterize the overall elastic response of the Earth to the tides ― Earth tides or body tides. Later, in 1912, Toshi Shida added a third Love number, l, which was needed to obtain a complete overall description of the solid Earth's response to the tides.

Definitions
The Love number h is defined as the ratio of the body tide to the height of the static equilibrium tide; also defined as the vertical (radial) displacement or variation of the planet's elastic properties. For a hypothetical solid Earth . For a liquid Earth, one would expect . However, the deformation of the sphere causes the potential field to change, and thereby deform the sphere even more. For the real Earth,  lies between 0 and 1.

The Love number k is defined as the cubical dilation or the ratio of the additional potential (self-reactive force) produced by the deformation of the deforming potential.

The Love number l represents the ratio of the horizontal (transverse) displacement of an element of mass of the planet's crust to that of the corresponding static ocean tide. As with h and k,  for a rigid body.

Values
The magnitudes of the Love numbers depend on the rigidity and mass distribution of the spheroid.

References 

Tides
Elasticity (physics)
Dimensionless numbers of mechanics
Geodynamics